Tegra is an Asian genus of bush-crickets in the tribe Cymatomerini and the subfamily Pseudophyllinae.

Species
The Catalogue of Life lists:
 Tegra novaehollandiae Haan, 1842 - type species (as Locusta novaehollandiae Haan) - 3 subspecies
 Tegra viridivitta Walker, 1870

References

External links

Tettigoniidae genera
Pseudophyllinae
Orthoptera of Indo-China